Ciudad del Carmen, Mexico is a Mexican football club that plays in the Tercera División de México. The club is based in Ciudad del Carmen, Mexico .

See also
Football in Mexico

External links
Official Page

References 

Football clubs in Campeche